Invasive lobular carcinoma (ILC) is breast cancer arising from the lobules of the mammary glands. It accounts for 5–10% of invasive breast cancer. Rare cases of this carcinoma have been diagnosed in men (see male breast cancer).

Types

The histologic patterns include:

Prognosis
Overall, the five-year survival rate of invasive lobular carcinoma was approximately 85% in 2003.

Diagnosis
On mammography, ILC shows spiculated mass with ill-defined margins that has similar or lower density than surrounding breast tissues. This happens only at 44–65% of the time. Architectural distortion on surrounding breast tissues is only seen in 10–34% of the cases. It can be reported as benign in 8–16% of the mammography cases.

Ultrasound has 68–98% sensitivity of detecting ILC. ILC shows irregular or angular mass with hypoechoic or heterogenous internal echoes, ill-defined or spiculated margins, and posterior acoustic shadowin.

Loss of E-cadherin is common in lobular carcinoma but is also seen in other breast cancers.

Treatment
Treatment includes surgery and adjuvant therapy.

References

External links 

Breast cancer